Palomino is the fifth album by the Duluth, Minnesota based band Trampled by Turtles. It was released on April 13, 2010, through their record label, Banjodad Records. The album reached #1 on the US Billboard bluegrass chart, and maintained a Top 10 position there for 52 consecutive weeks.

All songs on Palomino were written by Dave Simonett, except for “New Son/Burnt Iron”, which was written by Erik Berry, and “Sounds Like a Movie”, which was written by Dave Carroll. 
Music videos have been created for the first two tracks, "Wait So Long" and "Victory".

Personnel
Trampled by Turtles
Dave Simonett: vocals, guitar
Tim Saxhaug: bass, vocals
Dave Carroll: banjo, vocals
Erik Berry: mandolin
Ryan Young: fiddle

Charts

References

2010 albums
Trampled by Turtles albums